Harini Ramachandran, professionally known as Megha (born 18 March 1987) is a Tamil playback singer, singing predominantly in Tamil, Telugu, Malayalam and Kannada. She is also a co-founder of School of Excellence, that offers NLP programs and models.

Early life
Megha is a great grand daughter of Papanasam Sivan, a Carnatic composer. Born in Chennai, she relocated to Bangalore where she did most of her schooling. She did her bachelor's degree in Commerce in Chennai and pursued her master's degree in Human Resources whilst making a foray into the field of playback singing in 2007. She has completed grade 8 from Trinity College London in Western classical music under the guidance of renowned musician Augustine Paul from Chennai.

Career
Megha is a playback singer in the South Indian film industry. She was introduced into the film industry by music director Vijay Antony in the film Naan Avanillai (2007), and has worked with music directors including Ilaiyaraaja, A. R. Rahman, Harris Jayaraj, Devi Sri Prasad, Vijay Antony and D. Imman. After finding success in singing, she developed an interest in learning neuro-linguistic programming techniques. She got an opportunity to learn it from John Grinder, the founder of NLP. To pursue her interest further, in 2011 she co-founded School of Excellence to offer programs on NLP modelling to overcome personal issues and depressions. After exhibiting NLP sessions and programs for individuals, she along with co-founder of School of Excellence started working on conducting events and sessions to cover mass people, including NLP sessions for underprivileged kids of missionary schools in Mumbai to boost confidence and overcome personal challenges.  During this phase, Megha and his business partner started developing and innovating on a new technology for personal development called Excellence Installation Technology (EIT).  She has been working on developing a team of EIT experts, trained by them to provide business, health and legacy acceleration services through personal transformation using EIT across the country.

Live performances
Megha has performed live in various concerts, star nites and with music directors such as Harris Jayaraj on the Concert (world) tour – "Harris: On The Edge".

She actively performs in western classical concerts in Chennai and with the Madras Musical Association choir.

Discography

Tamil

Telugu

{| class="wikitable"
! Year !! Song !! Film !! Music director
|-
|2009 || " Mahalakshmi "|| Sankham || Thaman
|-
|2009 || " Dhakkudhakku "|| Sankham || Thaman
|-
|2009 || " AmmayiniPadayalante "|| U & I || Karthik
|-
|2009 || " MaasiMaasi "||  Ghatikudu ' || Harris Jayaraj
|-
|2009 || " Anjali"|| Anjaneyulu || Thaman
|-
|2009 || " KarigeLoga "|| Arya 2 || Devi Sri Prasad
|-
|2010 || " NamoVenkatesa "|| Namo Venkatesa || Devi Sri Prasad
|-
|2010 || " Boom Shakalaka "|| Syeaata || Devi Sri Prasad
|-
|2010 || "SingamSingam (theme)"|| Yamudu || Devi Sri Prasad
|-
|2010 || "Stole my heart"|| Yamudu || Devi Sri Prasad
|-
|2010 || " Chirugaaley "|| Mirapakaay || Thaman
|-
|2010 || "Jessie's Land "|| Ye Maaya Chesave || A R Rahman
|-
|2011 || "Rao gari abbayi"|| Mr. Perfect || Devi Sri Prasad
|-
|2011 || "AkasamBadhalaina "|| Mr. Perfect || Devi Sri Prasad
|-
|2011 || "Adara Adara"|| Dookudu || Thaman
|-
|2012 || "Cinderella"|| Endhukante Premanta || G. V. Prakash Kumar
|-
|2012 || "Chakkani Bike Undi"|| Julayi || Devi Sri Prasad
|-
|2012 || "Eppudu"|| Chinni Chinni Aasa || Karthik
|-
|2013 || "Meghamala"|| Jabardasth|| Thaman
|-
|2013 || "Padipoyanila"|| Balupu|| Thaman
|-
|2014 || "Gala Gala"|| Race Gurram|| Thaman
|-
|2014 || "Hawa Hawa"|| Rabhasa|| Thaman
|-
|2015 || "Dorikaade"|| Pandaga Chesko|| Thaman
|-
|2015 || "Lehchalo"|| Bruce Lee - The Fighter|| Thaman
|-
|2019 || "Touch Karo"||Voter|| Thaman
|}

Kannada

Malayalam

{| class="wikitable"
! Year !! Song !! Film !! Music director
|-
|rowspan=""|2010 || "NilaNila,"|| Tournament || Deepak Dev
|-
|rowspan=""|2010 || "Manassil,"|| Tournament || Deepak Dev
|-
|rowspan=""|2011 || "Chanja,"||  Trance (2020 film)'|| Sushin Shyam
|}

Awards
Kannadasan Award – Ajanta Fine Arts
2010: Nominated, Vijay Music Award for Best Song of the Masses – "Singham Singham" from Singam''

References

External links
 
 About Megha's
 

1987 births
Tamil playback singers
Telugu playback singers
Malayalam playback singers
Kannada playback singers
Indian women playback singers
Singers from Chennai
Tamil singers
Living people
21st-century Indian singers
Women Carnatic singers
Carnatic singers
Indian women classical singers
21st-century Indian women singers
Women musicians from Tamil Nadu